Jacobo Fitz-James Stuart y Ventimiglia, 15th Duke of Alba, GE (3 June 1821, Palermo, Sicily – 10 July 1881, Madrid, Spain) was a Spanish nobleman. He was a brother-in-law of Napoleon III through his wife, sister of Empress Eugenie.

Biography 
He was the son of Carlos Miguel Fitz-James Stuart, 14th Duke of Alba and Rosalia Ventimiglia dei Principi di Grammonte. He married at Madrid, on 14 February 1848 María Francisca Portocarrero-Palafox y KirkPatrick, 12ª Duchess of Peñaranda de Duero and daughter of Cipriano de Palafox y Portocarrero. They had three children:
Carlos Maria Fitz-James Stuart y Portocarrero-Palafox, 16th Duke of Alba, a.k.a. Carlos María Fitz-James Stuart, 16th Duke of Alba, born 4 December 1848.
María de la Asuncion Fitz-James-Stuart y Portocarrero-Palafox, 3rd Duchess of Galisteo, born 17 August 1851.
María Luisa Fitz-James Stuart y Portocarrero_Palafox, 19ª Duchess of Montoroso, born 19 October 1853.

The co-lateral titles of this 15 Duke of Alba were:
15th Duke of Alba
13th Duke of Huéscar
8th  Duke of Berwick
8th Duke of Liria and Jérica
8th  Duke of Montoro
11th Count-Duke of Olivares
11th Marquess of Elche
14th Marquess of Villanueva del Río
13th Marquess of Carpio
15th Count of  Gelves
18th Count of Modica
Órdenes
Great Cross of the Portuguese Order of N.S. da Conceição de Vila Viçosa (188) - 1868.

References
Ducado de Alba de Tormes
La Casa de Alba, Sampedro Escolar, José Luis, (aut.) La Esfera de los Libros S.L. 1ª ed., 1ª imp.(02/2007) 528 pages,in Spanish   

1821 births
1881 deaths
Jacobo
Dukes of Huéscar
Jacobo
Marquesses of Carpio
Berwick, Jacobo Fitz-James Stuart, 8th Duke of
Spanish nobility